KSRTC may refer to:

 Karnataka State Road Transport Corporation
 Kerala State Road Transport Corporation